was a Japanese anthropologist. A professor for decades at Kyoto University, he was also among the founders and the director-general of National Museum of Ethnology in Osaka, Japan. A number of Umesao's theories were influential on anthropologists, and his work was also well known among the general population of Japan.

Personal life
Tadao Umesao was born in 1920 in Kyoto, Japan. In 1943, he graduated from the Faculty of Science at Kyoto University. Umesao was initially educated as an animal ecologist, but as he conducted fieldwork with nomads in the steppes of Mongolia from 1944 to 1946, his interest shifted from animals to humans. He served as an assistant professor on the Faculty of Polytechnics at Osaka City University from 1949, achieving his doctoral degree from Kyoto University in 1961. In 1965, he took a position with his alma mater. In 1986, Umesao lost his eyesight due to a viral infection. He continued to write by dictation and to serve his profession. On his retirement in 1993, he was named professor emeritus at Kyoto University as well as at the National Museum of Ethnology. He died in 2010 at the age of 90.

The three ecological zones
In 1955, Umesao traveled through Afghanistan, Pakistan and India, shattering his conventional dualistic image of the continent consisting of “Seiyo” (Occident) and “Toyo” (Orient), and inspiring in him the notion of the “Chuyo” (Mediant, or Middle world). These reflections led to the paper “Introduction to the Ecological Conception of the History of Civilizations” (1957), which ten years later was expanded into a book, An Ecological View of History (1967).

In his theory, he divides the Eurasian continent into three major ecological zones: Japan, the Mediant, and Western Europe. He argues that Japan and Western Europe, because of their similar environmental and socio-historical conditions on the peripheries of imperial and civilizational centers, are analogous civilizations that evolved in parallel and autonomously. This view was influential for historians and anthropologists, but also popularly for the post-war generation of Japanese, as a counter model to the euro-centric conception of history, where Japan would have achieved modernization only through Western influences.

Comparative study of pastoral societies
He conducted studies on pastoral societies in Tanzania (1963–64) and in Libya (1968) as well. Whereas Euro-American pastoral anthropologists tended to concentrate their attention mainly on people, Umesao's approach differed in the way he focused on the interaction between animals and humans. The outcome of his research, The World of Hunting and Nomadism (1976), influenced subsequent Japanese pastoral anthropologists. For his contribution to the study of nomads, he was honored as a Person of Cultural Merit in Mongolia in 1998.

Information industry
Umesao also developed theories on the increasing importance of “information” as a social phenomenon, combining concepts of animal embryology and civilization history. In his “Information Industry Theory: Dawn of the Coming Era of the Ectodermal Industry” (1963), he claimed that following the agricultural age (that is comparable to the endodermic stage in embryology where the digestive system is formed) and the industrial age (which is the mesodermic stage where the bones, muscles and circulatory system appear), a new society will form around the information industry. He argued that with the development of mass media and computers, information will become an important economic factor, and that this was equivalent to the ectodermal stage where the brain, nerves and sense organs come to function. He was thus one of the earliest to predict the coming of the Information Age. His pioneering contribution was recognized with the C & C Prize funded by the NEC Corporation in 2002.

Popular press
Umesao's work was not limited to the theoretical side of scholarship. The Art of Intellectual Production (1969) was a guide on how to collect and record information, arrange them in a logical order, and compose the results of research in readable Japanese. It was a practical manual on information processing before the diffusion of computers, and it became a longtime best-seller. Many of his writings appeared in non-academic journals or as paperbacks, accessible to the general public.

National Museum of Ethnology
After his involvement in organizing the World Exposition of 1970 held in Osaka, Umesao was instrumental in the founding of the National Museum of Ethnology that opened in the Osaka Expo grounds in 1977. Appointed as head of the museum's preparatory office in 1974, he set forth his team of young scholars on ethnological expeditions across the globe assembling documentary materials and artifacts. He remained as the director-general of the museum until his retirement in 1993, continuing as museum's special advisor until his death in 2010.

It was upon the initiative of Dr. Umesao that the museum housed a series of international symposia on “Civilization Studies” between 1983 and 1998, funded by the Taniguchi Foundation. This was an international joint research project run in cooperation with prominent Japanologists, Josef Kreiner (Bonn University) and Harumi Befu (Stanford University). Scholars from Eurasia and North America were invited to discuss key issues concerning the Japanese civilization in the modern world, with the goal of reconfiguring the history of civilizations from a Japanese perspective. Publications followed in Japanese and English.

International dissemination
Umesao's most influential work was not accessible in English until only recently. However, his writings have been translated into French, German, Italian, Chinese, Mongolian, Esperanto, and Vietnamese. He has held lectures in Korea, U.S.A, Brazil, and France. He was invited in 1984 to give a lecture series at the Collège de France in Paris, an offer seldom presented to foreign scholars. He subsequently received the title of Commandeur of Ordre des Palmes académiques in 1988 from the French government.

Publications
Major Publications in Japanese
1956		Exploration to the Moghols in Afghanistan, Iwanami Shoten
1957		Ethnological Conception of the History of Civilizations, Chuo Koron-sha
1969		The Art of Intellectual Production, Iwanami Shoten
1974		The Japanese in the Global Age, Chuo Koron-sha
1976		The World of Hunting and Nomadism, Kodansha
1986	The Formation and Development of Modern Japanese Civilization, Nihon Hoso Shuppan Kyokai
1987		The Museum as Media, Heibonsha
1988		Civilization Theory on Information, Chuo Koron-sha
1988		Women and Civilization, Chuo Koron-sha
1989		Research Management Theory, Iwanami Shoten
1989–94	Collected Works of Tadao Umesao, Chuo Koron-sha
1997		Action and Imagination: an autobiography, Nihon Keizai Shinbunsha
2000	Japanese Civilization in the Modern World: Comparative Study of Civilizations, Chuo Koron Shinsha

Publications in other languages:
1983  	Le Japon à l'ère Planétaire, Paris : Publications Orientalistes de France.
1984  	Il Giappone Nell'era Planetaria, Milano: Spirali Edizioni.
1988	“Prolegomena zu einer historischen Betrachtung zivilisierter Lebensformen“ in Japan ohne Mythos, Munich: Iudicium.
1998	The Roots of Contemporary Japan (trilingual in English, Japanese and Chinese), Tokyo: The Japan Forum.
2002	Ecological and Anthropological Study of the Nomadic Culture of Mongolia, Hohhot: People's Press of Inner Mongolia.
2003  	An Ecological View of History: Japanese Civilization in the World Context, Edited by Harumi Befu, Translated by Beth Cary, Melbourne: Trans Pacific Press.
An Ecological View of History was also translated into Chinese (Shanghai, 1988) and Vietnamese (Ha Noi, 2007)

Awards and honors
Jan. 1988 	The Asahi Prize, Japan
Apr. 1988 	Commandeur, Ordre des Palmes Académiques, France
May 1988	Medal with Purple Ribbon, Japan
Oct. 1990	Japan Foundation Award, 1990.
Nov. 1991	Person of Cultural Merit, Japan
Nov. 1994	Order of Culture, Japan
Jul. 1998	Person of Cultural Merit, Mongolia
Nov. 1999	Grand Cordon of the Order of the Sacred Treasure, Japan
Oct. 2002	C&C Prize (Foundation for Computers and Communications Promotion), Japan

Notes

Japanese anthropologists
Japanese lexicographers
Kyoto University alumni
Academic staff of Kyoto University
1920 births
2010 deaths
People from Kyoto
Japanese Esperantists
Blind academics
Commandeurs of the Ordre des Palmes Académiques
Recipients of the Order of the Sacred Treasure, 1st class
Recipients of the Order of Culture
Recipients of the Medal with Purple Ribbon
Expatriates in Tanzania